Gilserberg is a municipality in the Schwalm-Eder district in Hesse, Germany.

Geography

Location
Gilserberg lies at the foot of the Kellerwald, a low mountain range, nestled in the Kurhessen Highland on Federal Highway (Bundesstraße) B 3, 60 km from Kassel and 30 km from Marburg.

Constituent communities
Together with the main centre, which also bears the same name as the whole municipality, the ten centres of Appenhain, Heimbach, Itzenhain, Lischeid, Moischeid, Sachsenhausen,  Schönau, Schönstein, Sebbeterode and Winterscheid also belong to the community of Gilserberg.

History
Gilserberg had its first documentary mention in 1262.

Religion

Jewish community
There was a Jewish community in Gilserberg from the 18th century through to sometime after 1933. The Jewish population peaked about 1900 at 70 or more persons. The first synagogue was supposedly built about the beginning of the 19th century. A newer one was festively consecrated on 12 January 1898. However, it was destroyed on Kristallnacht (9 November 1938). At least four of the community's Jewish residents were murdered in Nazi death camps. All that is left nowadays in Gilserberg of the former Jewish community is a small Jewish graveyard.

Amalgamations
As part of Hesse's municipal reforms, the formerly independent communities of Gilserberg, Heimbach, Lischeid, Moischeid, Sachsenhausen, Schönau, Schönstein, Sebbeterode and Winterscheid voluntarily combined to form the community of Gilserberg on 1 January 1972. On 1 April of the same year, the communities of Appenhain and Itzenhain also joined, making the community complete.

Town partnership
  Rocheservière, France.

References

External links
 Gilserberg's website
 Information about Jewish history and the synagogue

Schwalm-Eder-Kreis
Holocaust locations in Germany